Romelo Delante Trimble (born February 2, 1995) is an American professional basketball player for Shanghai Sharks of the Chinese Basketball Association (CBA). He played at Bishop Denis J. O'Connell High School in Arlington, Virginia, where he was a McDonald's All-American. He played college basketball at the University of Maryland. He is known to be one of Maryland's greatest point guards in recent history.

College career

Maryland (2014–2017)
Trimble committed to play for Mark Turgeon's Maryland Terrapins in December 2012.

His performance as a freshman earned him a selection on the  John R. Wooden Award midseason Top 25. On January 17, 2015, Trimble scored 21 points and 5 three-pointers in the first half versus Michigan State. Trimble has scored 20 points or more in 7 contests in his first season, with a career-high 31 points in a win over Arizona State

On January 9, 2016, Trimble hit a game-winning 3-point-shot against the Wisconsin Badgers, helping the Terps improve to 15–1 on the season, one of the best starts in school history. On February 1, 2016, he was named one of 10 finalists for the Bob Cousy Point Guard of the Year Award. He was named to the 35-man midseason watchlist for the Naismith Trophy on February 11.

Trimble returned to Maryland for his junior year. He hit a 3-point shot with 1.1 seconds left in the Terps' final home game of the 2016–17 season to beat Michigan State 63–60, earning Maryland a tie for second place in the Big Ten after being picked 10th in the media's preseason poll. Trimble was named to the midseason watchlist for the Naismith Trophy award for the second straight year, and he was unanimously named by the coaches to the All-Big Ten First Team.

At the conclusion of his junior season, Trimble announced his intention to forgo his final season of collegiate eligibility and enter the 2017 NBA draft.

College statistics

|-
| style="text-align:left;"| 2014–15
| style="text-align:left;"| Maryland
| 35 || 35 || 33.5 || .444 || .412 || .863 || 3.9 || 3.0 || 1.3 || .1 || 16.2
|-
| style="text-align:left;"| 2015–16
| style="text-align:left;"| Maryland
| 36 || 36 || 32.9 || .410 || .314 || .863 || 3.6 || 4.9 || 1.3 || .2 || 14.8
|-
| style="text-align:left;"| 2016–17
| style="text-align:left;"| Maryland
| 33 || 33 || 32.1 || .436 || .317 || .789 || 3.6 || 3.7 || 1.1 || .2 || 16.8
|- class="sortbottom"
| style="text-align:center;" colspan="2"| Career
| 104 || 104 || 32.8 || .429 || .343 || .841 || 3.7 || 3.9 || 1.2 || .1 || 15.9

Professional career
Trimble worked out for nine NBA teams, including the Washington Wizards, after the NBA Combine concluded. After going undrafted in 2017 NBA draft, Trimble joined the Philadelphia 76ers for the 2017 NBA Summer League. Trimble averaged 10.3 points per game in three games for the 76ers in the Summer League. On September 18, 2017, Trimble signed with the Minnesota Timberwolves. He was waived on October 14 as one of the team's final preseason roster cuts. He joined the Iowa Wolves in the NBA G League as an affiliate player. In July 2018, he played for the Chicago Bulls in the 2018 NBA Summer League.

On August 9, 2018, Trimble signed with the Cairns Taipans for the 2018–19 NBL season. In his debut for the Taipans on October 13, 2018, Trimble scored 32 points in an 88–70 win over the Brisbane Bullets, setting the most points scored by a Taipans player on debut. He played in all 28 games, finishing second in scoring after averaging 22.5 points along with 4.6 assists, 3.9 rebounds and 1.2 steals in 34 minutes of action per game. He subsequently earned All-NBL Second Team honors. Following the NBL season, he moved to Puerto Rico to play for Piratas de Quebradillas. In 26 games for Quebradillas, he averaged 17.4 points, 2.8 rebounds and 6.3 assists per game.

Melbourne United
On April 26, 2019, Trimble signed with the Melbourne United for the 2019–20 NBL season. He appeared in all 31 games for United, averaging 19.9 points, 3.3 rebounds, 4.5 assists and 1.3 steals per game.

Estudiantes
On March 11, 2020, Trimble signed with Estudiantes of the Spanish Liga ACB for the rest of the 2019–20 season.

Fuenlabrada
On June 22, 2020, Trimble signed with Fuenlabrada for the 2020–21 ACB season.

Galatasaray Nef
On August 10, 2021, he signed with Galatasaray of the Turkish BSL.

National team career
Trimble represented the United States national team at the 2015 Pan American Games, where he won a bronze medal.

References

External links

 UMTerps.com biography

1995 births
Living people
Converts to Sunni Islam from Catholicism
American Sunni Muslims
All-American college men's basketball players
American expatriate basketball people in Australia
American expatriate basketball people in Spain
American men's basketball players
Baloncesto Fuenlabrada players
Basketball players at the 2015 Pan American Games
Basketball players from Maryland
Cairns Taipans players
Galatasaray S.K. (men's basketball) players
Iowa Wolves players
Liga ACB players
Maryland Terrapins men's basketball players
McDonald's High School All-Americans
Medalists at the 2015 Pan American Games
Melbourne United players
Pan American Games bronze medalists for the United States
Pan American Games medalists in basketball
People from Upper Marlboro, Maryland
Piratas de Quebradillas players
Point guards
United States men's national basketball team players